Ruffia is a comune (municipality) in the Province of Cuneo in the Italian region Piedmont, located about  south of Turin and about  north of Cuneo.

Ruffia borders the following municipalities: Cavallerleone, Cavallermaggiore, Monasterolo di Savigliano, Murello, Scarnafigi, and Villanova Solaro.

Demographic evolution

References

Cities and towns in Piedmont